Edmund L. Hartmann (September 24, 1911 – November 28, 2003) was a film and television writer and producer from the 1930s to the 1970s. He was born in St. Louis, Missouri. He attended Washington University in St. Louis. He later married and had one child (Susan Hartmann). Hartmann worked with numerous actors, including Bob Hope. He produced the television classic My Three Sons for ten seasons from 1962 and also produced Family Affair. Both shows were filmed by Don Fedderson Productions.

He was a great-grandfather to seven children and a grandfather to four. He died in his sleep in his long-time home in Santa Fe, New Mexico.

Works

Writer

After the Honeymoon (1971)
The Shakiest Gun in the West (1968)
The Sword of Ali Baba (1965)
Casanova's Big Night (1954)
Here Come the Girls (1953)
The Caddy (1953)
My Favorite Spy (1951)
The Lemon Drop Kid (1951)
Fancy Pants (1950)
Sorrowful Jones (1949)
The Paleface (1948)
Let's Live a Little (1948)
Variety Girl (1947)
The Face of Marble (1946)
The Naughty Nineties (1945)
Sudan (1945)
See My Lawyer (1945)
Here Come the Co-Eds (1945)
The Scarlet Claw (1944)
Ali Baba and the Forty Thieves (1944)
Sherlock Holmes and the Secret Weapon (1943)
Hi Diddle Diddle (1943)
Hi'ya, Chum (1943)
Lady Bodyguard (1943)
Sherlock Holmes and the Secret Weapon (1942)
Ride 'Em Cowboy (1942)
The Feminine Touch (1941)
Sweetheart of the Campus (1941)
Time Out for Rhythm (1941)
San Francisco Docks (1940)
Diamond Frontier (1940)
South to Karanga (1940)
Enemy Agent (1940)
Ma! He's Making Eyes at Me (1940)
Black Friday (1940)
Two Bright Boys (1939)
Ex-Champ (1939)
Big Town Czar (1939)
The Last Warning (1938)
The Last Express (1938)
Law of the Underworld (1938)
Hideaway (1937)
Behind the Headlines (1937)
The Man Who Found Himself (1937)
China Passage (1937)
Wanted! Jane Turner (1936)
Without Orders (1936)
The Big Noise

Producer
To Rome With Love (1969)
Family Affair (1966)
My Three Sons (1960)

External links

1911 births
2003 deaths
20th-century American screenwriters
American male screenwriters
American male television writers
American television producers
American television writers
Washington University in St. Louis alumni
Writers from St. Louis